Gerald Haddon (born 31 May 1941) is a New Zealand cricketer. He played in four first-class matches for Central Districts in 1969/70.

See also
 List of Central Districts representative cricketers

References

External links
 

1941 births
Living people
New Zealand cricketers
Central Districts cricketers
Cricketers from Palmerston North